Palthisomis is a monotypic moth genus in the family Erebidae erected by William Schaus in 1916. Its only species, Palthisomis baresalis, was first described by Francis Walker in 1916. It is found in Rio de Janeiro, Brazil.

References

Herminiinae
Monotypic moth genera